The Bulgarian Diocese of the Orthodox Church in America (also known as the Bulgarian Diocese of Toledo, and originally known as the Bulgarian Diocese in Exile) is one of three ethnic dioceses of the Orthodox Church in America (OCA). It was created in 1963 by Eastern Orthodox Christians of Bulgarian and Macedonian descent. Its territory includes parishes, monasteries, and missions located in seven states in the United States: California, Illinois, Indiana, Virginia, Michigan, Ohio, Iowa, and Washington, D.C.  The first bishop of the diocese was the Most Reverend Kyrill (Yonchev), who also served as the Archbishop of Pittsburgh and Western Pennsylvania. After his repose on June 17, 2007, Metropolitan Herman served as locum tenens of the diocese until the election of Archimandrite Alexander (Golitzin) on October 4, 2011. On May 5, 2012, he was consecrated as bishop of the diocese during a Hierarchical Divine Liturgy at Saint George Orthodox Cathedral in Rossford, Ohio.

History 
As a result of the establishment of a Communist government in Bulgaria after the World War II, relations of the Bulgarian Eastern Orthodox Diocese of the USA, Canada and Australia with the Bulgarian Orthodox Church were disrupted. In the late 1950s, its head Metropolitan Andrew (Petkov) petitioned to be accepted into the Russian Metropolia (now known as the Orthodox Church in America), but had been declined by them for unclear reasons. Then, Andrew decided to regularize his relations with and return to the Bulgarian Orthodox Church, with whom he had broken communications. In 1963, he petitioned and was approved by the Holy Synod in Sofia to be readmitted to the Bulgarian Orthodox Church and continue to lead Bulgarian Orthodoxy in North America. 

One of his prominent clergy, Archimandrite Kyrill (Yonchev), disagreed with his decision to return the diocese to an Orthodox Church based in a communist country, and therefore left it to join the Russian Orthodox Church Outside of Russia, where he was ordained bishop of the new Bulgarian Diocese in Exile. Sharing his fear that the Bulgarian Orthodox Church was strongly influenced by the communist regime in Sofia, many Macedono-Bulgarian Orthodox communities in the United States and Canada (organized under the auspices of the Macedonian Patriotic Organization), voiced their support for Bishop Kyrill and transferred their parishes, or created new ones, under his authority. Bishop Kyrill also persuaded many to accept his authority due partly to Metropolitan Andrew's advanced age.

In 1976, Bishop Kyrill and his Bulgarian Diocese in Exile left the ROCOR and joined the Orthodox Church in America, thus creating its current Bulgarian Diocese.

List of Parishes

Notes and references

See also

 Bulgarian Eastern Orthodox Diocese of the USA, Canada and Australia

External links 

 Official website
Official Video of the History of the Bulgarian Diocese of Toledo

Bulgarian
Eastern Orthodoxy in the United States
Christian organizations established in 1965
Eastern Orthodox dioceses in Canada
Dioceses established in the 20th century
Bulgarian-American history
Bulgarian Canadian
Eastern Orthodoxy in Ohio